A petrosomatoglyph is a supposed image of parts of a human or animal body in rock. They occur all over the world, often functioning as an important form of symbolism, used in religious and secular ceremonies, such as the crowning of kings. Some are regarded as artefacts linked to saints or culture heroes.

Feet are the most common; however, other features including knees, elbows, hands, heads and fingers are also found.

Stylised representations of parts of the body are often open to dispute and are therefore on the fringes of acceptability as identifiable petrosomatoglyphs. Natural objects, such as rock crystals and rock formations which look like petrosomatoglyphs, whole animals, plants, etc., are collectively called "mimetoliths".

Natural versus man-made petrosomatoglyphs
Many examples of petrosomatoglyphs are likely to be natural in origin, such as rock-cut basins in rivers; however, they still have relevance, as they have often become associated with Saints, legendary figures, fairies, etc.  Some may be man-made, but have been reinterpreted as petrosomatoglyphs by the original function being forgotten.

A typical example of a possibly re-used concavity is the footprint on Dunadd which some locals at one time thought was a cast for a bronze axe head. A pseudofossil of what looks like a footprint of a human foot wearing a sandal with a trilobite fossil in the print has been quoted by anti-evolutionists to show that modern man did walk the earth at this time, around five hundred million years ago. The Burdick Print (or Burdick Track) from Glen Rose, Texas, USA, is claimed by some creationists to be part of a "giant man track", supposedly produced by a giant walking alongside dinosaurs.

Animal petrosomatoglyphs

Dogs
In the Mabinogion, the story is told of Culhwch and Olwen, and part of this relates to the hunting by King Arthur and his knights of the wild boar Twrch Trwyth with dogs. Cefn Carn Cafall (the ridge of Cafall's cairn) is a mountain near Builth in Breconshire where the footprint of King Arthur's favourite hunting dog, Cafall, is located in a conglomerate boulder on top of the cairn. If taken away, the boulder always mysteriously returns to its position on the cairn. Cafal or Cabal also appears in Geraint of the Mabinogion as Arthur's favourite hunting dog in the hunting of the white stag. The Black Dog of Blythburgh in Suffolk entered the church and killed a few people in its progress through the building before exiting and leaving its claw-marks on various stones in the building.

Horses
In Europe: Wales and Cornwall Royal and other horses were sacred to Epona, the horse-goddess. Near Castell Cilan in Gwynedd, North Wales, is a stone embedded in the ground bearing the hoof-print of King Einion's horse. At Llanllyfni in Wales is the hoof-print of the horse of St. Gredfyw. Close to Llyn Barfog in Wales is a hoof-print etched deep into the rock "Carn March Arthur", or the "Stone of Arthur's Horse", which was supposedly made by King Arthur's mount, Llamrai, when it was hauling the terrible Addanc, or "afanc" monster, from the lake. At the Creiqiau Tylwch near Llangurig, Oliver Cromwell is said to have ridden his horse over the precipitous rocks and left behind a hoof print.

Not far from the Devil's Quoit in St. Columb, on the edge of Goss Moor in Cornwall, is a large stone with four deeply impressed marks, known as "King Arthur's Stone". The marks are said to be footprints made by the horse upon which Arthur rode when he resided at Castle an Dinas and hunted on the moors. A Welsh legend has King Arthur pursuing Morgan le Fay, who turns herself into a stone. Arthur's steed leaps across the Bristol Channel, leaving its hoof-prints on a rock.

In Europe: Scotland At Loch Loran in Kilmichael, Argyll and Bute, are five flat stones bearing what may be natural markings improved by light pecking. They lie under water near the inlet at the northern end of the loch and can be best seen in dry weather. Two of the markings are called the "Fairy Footprints", and close behind them are two ovals and several V-hollows suggesting large hoof-prints. On Loch Etiveside, near Ben Cruachan in Argyll, is the place named "Horseshoes" indicating the stone by the loch's side where the horse belonging to the son of the winter hag (the Cailleach or Carlin) left its hoof-prints as it leapt across an arm of the sea. At Shielhill Bridge near Memus in Angus, Scotland, a Kelpie's cloven hoof mark is to be seen on a stone in the river. At Kelso in Roxburgh Street is the outline of a horseshoe where the horse of Prince Charles Edward Stuart cast a shoe as he was riding it through the town on his way to Carlisle in 1745. Sir Fergus Barclay, Baron of Ardrossan was in league with the devil, and in one of his dealings, he set the task of the devil to make ropes from sand; upon failing to do so, Satan kicked the castle with his hoof and left a hoof-print. A horse's hoof is carved on a rock at Eggerness in Galloway, Scotland.

In Europe: England At Tedstone Delamere in Herefordshire, England, the Sapey Brook runs its course to Upper Sapey. A mare and a colt had been stolen, and the hoof-prints stopped at the bank of the brook. The owner prayed for their safe return and, upon examining the bed of the brook, saw hoof-prints clearly visible in the rocky bottom. These hoof-prints were followed and, the thief caught, the horses being safely recovered. The nearby Hoar Stone is said to be the horse thief petrified for his crimes. A later version involves Saint Catherine of Ledbury as the owner of the horses.

In Asia A winged horse named El-Buraq, which had the face and breasts of a woman and the tail of a peacock, was tethered for a period of time on the Rock, or foundation stone of the Holy Jewish Temple in Israel, leaving a hoof-print on the Rock. It is said that the hoof print of Muhammad's steed, El Burak, from which he was propelled to heaven, can be seen imprinted in the Foundation Stone in Jerusalem.

Other animals
St Victor Petroglyphs Provincial Park, Saskatchewan, Canada, features footprint petrosomatoglyphs of bison, deer, elk and antelope.

Cattle  At South Lopham in Norfolk, England is the Ox-Foot Stone, which previously lay in a meadow still known as the Oxfoot Piece, and bears the supposed imprint of an ox's foot. The legend goes that in a time of great famine, a miraculous cow appeared and provided a never-ending supply of milk to the starving poor. When the famine ceased, the cow struck its hoof against the stone leaving the imprint and then vanished. The stone itself is a flattish slab of sandstone about 60 cm x 90 cm, likely deposited during the last ice age as a Glacial erratic, and the 'hoofprint' is probably the imprint of a fossil bivalve. This part of East Anglia has virtually no naturally occurring stone (local geology being boulder clay with flints overlaid on chalk), so the Stone's very existence would have been notable. The stone now stands outside the door of Oxfootstone Farm House.

A sacred Celtic bull is said to have left its hoof print in a stone "as if it were the softest wax" in a legend relating to Saint Ninian.

Bears In Roseville, California, a bear footprint was carved into one portion of the Northstar stone representative of a bear walking in a docile manner, the back print overlapping with the print of the forepaw. A bear footprint carving is located in Northwestern California. A large carving representing the claw marks of a bear can be seen at Chaw'se, Indian Grinding Rock State Park, near Fiddletown, California. St Victor Petroglyphs Provincial Park, Saskatchewan, Canada, contains grizzly bear paw print petroglyphs.

Mythical and folkloric beings

Fairies
At Loch Loran in Kilmichael, Argyll and Bute, are five flat stones bearing what may be natural markings improved by light pecking. They lie under water near the inlet at the northern end of the loch and can be best seen in dry weather. Two of the markings are called the "Fairy Footprints", being 11" overall, close together, with narrow heels which point across the loch. The left foot has possibly artificially added toes. Close behind are two ovals and several V-hollows suggesting large hoof-prints. They were not located on a visit in 1970. On Wangan Island, one of the Penghu group between China and Taiwan, are a group of fairy footprints on the top of Tiantai hill. In the very remote Pony Hills, New Mexico, near the desert border with Mexico, are examples of shamanic rock art. The site is located around a spring-fed rock pool. The images depict a variety of spirit forms and also tiny carved footprints—the trail of Water Baby spirits trekking from one pool to another.

The devil
At the ruined Kirk of Lady, near Overbister on Sanday, Orkney, are the Devil's Fingermarks, incised as parallel grooves into the parapet of the kirk. In North Kingstown is a large, granite ledge known as Devil's Foot Rock. Legends going back to the colonial era tell of a Native woman being chased by the devil. Some say that she fled from Boston. Her pursuer is said to have left his footprints at Devil's Foot Rock, then at Chimney Hill in South Kingstown, and finally at Block Island.

At Dol de Bretagne in Brittany are found the supposed claw mark of the Devil on Mont Dol as well as the footprints of St. Michael. Near Holmfirth in Yorkshire, the devil left his footprints as scorch marks on Netherton Edge. One day, the legend says that the Devil disguised himself as a druid in an attempt to gain favour with the old priests, but was discovered in his plans and so, in anger, flew out across the hills carrying a great stone with him, which he dropped from the skies and it landed where the Hood Hill Stone still remains. Also, in anger, he jumped down and stood on the great rock and in doing so, left his footprint impressed upon the stone. The site is at Kilburn, Northallerton, in Yorkshire. In Lancashire, the Devil is said to have thrown stones at Clitheroe Castle and left his footprints in Deerstones Quarry near Pendle. At Castle Bentheim in Germany, there is a curious smooth rock that in legend the Devil is said to have used as a pillow, leaving behind an imprint of his ear. In Cologne, on a heavy stone called Teufelsstein, are imprinted the hands and talons of the Devil. The Lugenstein in the cathedral square at Halberstadt was carried there by the Devil to destroy the cathedral. It was too heavy, and he dropped it, apparently leaving behind an imprint of his red hot thumb.

Sir Fergus Barclay, also known as the De'il of Ardrossan, was a horseman, famous around the lands for his tremendous skill. The secret to his skill, however, was a magical bridle, which was given to Barclay by the devil, in exchange for his soul. However, the devil was tricked by Barclay into giving his soul back. Infuriated by this trickery, the devil attacked the castle in his rage and is said to have left his hoof prints on one of the rocks.

The 'Packstone' is a huge whinstone block to be found at the farm of that name near Muirhead, Shotts. The story goes that the magician Michael Scot had relatives in the area and he employed the devil to build a bridge across the Firth of Forth at South Queensferry however he fell out with his builder and the devil threw down the 'pack' he was carrying and the marks of his shoulders are still to be seen on the stone.

On the eastern wall of the church of Saint Pancras in the ancient monastery of Saint Augustine outside Canterbury is to be seen the imprint of the devil's talons as he was furious that his heathen temple had become a Christian place of worship. On a coping stone of the Devil's Bridge at Kirkby Lonsdale in Cumbria are the fingermarks of the devil left behind when in his fury at being tricked out of a soul.

At Garry Point on the old Finnart Estate in South Ayrshire a cloven hoof print can be seen embedded in the rock. The legend states that this is the site where the Devil landed when St Patrick kicked him out of Ireland.

At the entrance to the Munich Frauenkirche church in Bavaria is located the Devil's Footstep or Teufelsschritt. This mark in a tile resembles a footprint, which according to legend was where the devil stood after he had made a deal with the builder to finance construction of the church on the condition that it contain no windows. The builder managed to trick the devil by siting columns so that the windows were not visible from the spot where the devil stood at the entrance. The devil eventually worked out that he had been tricked, however he could not enter a consecrated church and could only stand in the entrance foyer, stamping his foot furiously, leaving the footprint that remains visible in the church's entrance today.

Legend also says the devil then rushed outside and manifested its evil spirit in the wind that furiously rages around the church.

Giants
On a natural stone in Cornwall is a foot-shaped impression in a rock in the valley leading to the cliffs and coastal footpath near Chapel Porth. It is said to be the foot mark of Giant Bolster of St Agnes legend. Just below the formation, there used to be a Holy Well dedicated to St Agnes, but it dried up due to the mining in the area. Footprints at North Yell, up Hena, in Shetland were thought to be lost but were rediscovered in 1969 by the ordnance survey. The footprint, 12" by 4", is known locally as the "Wartie" and was used to wash in dew or rainwater, and standing in it was supposed to get rid of warts. In legend, it was made by a giant placing one foot here and the other on the Westing of Unst. In Bristol, the giants Vincent and Goram dug the Avon gorge and left their footprints. Moso's Footprint in Samoa was made when the giant Moso stepped over to Samoa from Fiji, and the other footprint can be found on Viti Levu of Fiji. It is a 1 m by 3 m rock enclosure. At the foot of the Doa mountain in Vietnam, towards the west, is a big rock. There are two human footprints on the rock. It is said that the footprints belonged to a giant who used to help the villagers with the construction of their houses. One of the footprints has been damaged. At Arthur's Stone chambered tomb in Herefordshire is a "cup mark" stone which bears the imprints of a giant's (or king's) elbow, left behind after he fell dead to the ground, killed by King Arthur.

In Connecticut there is a stone called Samson Rock, which, according to some sources, bears the imprint of the Algonquin giant Odziozo.

Religious leaders, patriarchs and saints

Adam
The Sri Pada footprint in the rock atop Adam's Peak, Sri Lanka is attributed to Adam by Christians and Muslims.

Abraham
The Maqam Ibrahim ("Abraham's place of standing") is a rock kept in a crystal dome next to the Ka'bah in Mecca. The footprint in it is believed, by Muslim tradition, to have been made by Abraham when he was lifting stone blocks to build the Ka'bah.

Archangel Gabriel
In Islamic tradition, the Foundation Stone is where Muhammad ascended to heaven, and during this ascension, the rock itself started to rise at the southern end but was held down by the Archangel Gabriel, and some marks on the western side of the rock are said to be the fingerprints of Gabriel.

The Buddha

The footprints of the Buddha abound throughout Asia, dating from various periods. Japanese author , who spent years tracking down the footprints in many Asian countries, estimates that he found more than 3,000 such footprints, among them about 300 in Japan and more than 1,000 in Sri Lanka. They often bear distinguishing marks, such as a Dharmachakra at the centre of the sole, or the 32, 108 or 132 auspicious signs of the Buddha, engraved or painted on the sole.

Buddhist legend holds that during his lifetime the Buddha flew to Sri Lanka and left his footprint on Adam's Peak to indicate the importance of Sri Lanka as the perpetuator of his teachings, and also left footprints in all lands where his teachings would be acknowledged. In Thailand, the most important of these "natural" footprints imbedded in rock is at Phra Phutthabat in Central Thailand. In China, during Tang Dynasty, the discovery of a large footprint of the Buddha in Chengzhou caused Empress Wu Zetian to inaugurate a new reign name in that year, 701 CE, starting the Dazu (Big Foot) era.

There are two forms: natural, as found in stone or rock, and those made artificially. Many of the "natural" ones, of course, are acknowledged not to be actual footprints of the Buddha, but replicas or representations of them, which can be considered cetiya (Buddhist relics) and also an early aniconic and symbolic representation of the Buddha.

Jesus

At the Chapel of the Ascension in Jerusalem, there are a pair of footprints reputed to be those of Jesus made at the time of his Ascension into heaven. These are sometimes shown in medieval depictions of the Ascension in art.

The church of Saint Sebastian Outside the Walls in Rome houses a stone which, according to tradition, bears the footprints of Jesus when he appeared to Saint Peter on the Appian Way. A copy of these footprints is preserved, as an ex voto offering, at the Church of Domine Quo Vadis, the chapel marking the traditional spot of Jesus' appearance to Peter.

Henry III of England was given a piece of white marble which allegedly carried a trace of one of Jesus' feet, which he had left as a souvenir to his apostles after his Ascension. Henry gave this relic to Westminster Abbey. This may simply have been a votive copy of the footprint in the Chapel of the Ascension.

Mary, the mother of Jesus
In Wales, the knees and breasts of Mary are said to be imprinted on a rock beside her well at Ffynnon Fair, Llanfair, between Barmouth and Harlech in Gwynedd. Marks said to be her footprint and thumb-print are to be found nearby. Two other Mary footprints are recorded in the vicinity at Llan Maria (St. Mary) near Llanbedr, and Wenallt Hill at Llanaber.

At Pochayiv Lavra in western Ukraine, there is a footprint which by tradition was left in the stone by the Theotokos (Virgin Mary) after her miraculous appearance to two monks in the 15th century. A spring of water which is believed to have miraculous powers flows from the footprint to this day.

At Stow of Wedale in the Scottish Borders a stone near the Lady's Well and old church of St Mary is said to bear the footprint of the Virgin Mary.

Muhammad
At the Qubbat al-Sanaya (the Dome of the Front Teeth) the mark made by the Muhammad's tooth is to be found on a stone in a wall. Muhammad was attacked and lost a tooth during the incident. A mark on a stone wall is said to have been made when the tooth fell. Muhammad's footprints are (by Islamic tradition) found in numerous places, such as the Dome of the Rock in Jerusalem, in Damascus, and in mosques in West Bengal, Bangladesh and Gudjarat. It is said that the hoof print of Muhammad's steed al-Burāq, upon which he was propelled to heaven, can be seen imprinted in the Foundation Stone.

Rama
The footprint in the rock at Hampi is attributed to that of Rama.

Shiva
The Sri Pada footprint in the rock atop Adam's Peak, Sri Lanka is attributed to that of Shiva by Hindus (and the Buddha by Buddhists).

Human petrosomatoglyphs

Footprints

The Romans were accustomed to carve pairs of footprints on a stone with the inscription pro itu et reditu, "for the journey and return". They used them for protective rites on leaving for a journey and for thanksgiving for a safe return, when the traveler would place his feet in the footprints to mark the beginning or end of the undertaking. This same story is told of King Maelgwn of Gwynedd in North Wales, who placed his feet in carved footprints to ensure his safe return from a pilgrimage to Rome.

In northern Europe, rock footprints were closely associated with Kingship or Chieftainship. Saxo Grammaticus notes that "The ancients, when they came to choose a King, stood on stones planted in the ground to proclaim their votes, signifying from the steadfastness of the stones that the deed would be lasting."

Standing on a special stone is a link between the king and the land from which his people earned their food. Links with King Arthur and "The Sword in the Stone" may be relevant in this context of kingship, a right to power over his subjects and links with nature. A similar idea seems to be associated with the Moot hill, or Boot Hill, at Scone, for the latter name comes from an ancient tradition whereby emissaries swore fealty to their king by wearing the earth of their own lands in their foot-bindings or boots.

The upper echelons of the clergy of the Celtic Church were drawn from the nobility; indeed, even some kings retired to become monks and eventually even saints, as in the case of King Constantine of Cornwall, who retired to Govan on the Clyde in Scotland. This meant that the association of stone footprints was also made with the saints, bishops and others.

The poet Spenser states that the custom amongst the Irish was to place the man who is to be chief upon a stone, always reserved for that purpose alone and located on a hill. Some of these had a footprint cut into them which was the size and shape of the candidate's. The oath was taken with the foot in the footprint, the individual swearing that as chief he would preserve all the ancient customs and respect the laws of royal inheritance.

A Locus terribilis is a sacred place into which only a divine or sacred person could enter. Petrosomatoglyph footprints for the ordination of kings would be an example, for it was believed that only the rightful king was able to use them for the purpose that they were intended. Footprints may also have to do with the cult of the ancestors, whose spirits dwell in the stone, so that a newly invested King would have received the luck or mana of his predecessors through contact with it.

Footprints have been found in Sweden, Denmark, Italy, Sri Lanka (Adam's Foot), and Uganda.

Footprints in Scotland

In Ayr, on the southern bank of the River Ayr is 'Wallace's Heel', a natural sandstone slab from which flows a small spring. Sir William Wallace is said to have left the imprint behind whilst rushing to escape English soldiers who were pursuing him. He later returned to the spring, and dug out a bigger hole to get fresh water for him and his soldiers. Among cup and ring marks on a boulder at Carnasserie, two miles (3 km) from Kilmartin in Argyll, are carved a pair of feet. At St. Mary's Church in Burwick, South Ronaldsay, Orkney, is the Ladykirk Stone on which St. Magnus is said to have sailed over the Pentland Firth. It has two clear footprints cut into it. A pair of footprints is carved in a stone slab in a causeway at the Broch of Clickhimin (or Clickemin), Lerwick, in Shetland. This site was occupied from about 1000 BC to AD 500. Two footprints are to be found at Dunadd (Dun Monaidh), ancient capital of the Gaelic kingdom of Dál Riata. The completed one faces north and is accompanied by an image of a boar, rock-basins possibly cut for ceremonial ablutions and an ogham inscription. This footprint is said to be that of Oisin or Fergus Mor Mac Erca, the first King of Dalriada, who died in AD 501. St. Columba is said to have installed Aidan as King on this rock. The best preserved footprint is 27 cm long, nearly 11 cm wide, 9 cm across at the heel and 2.5 cm deep; so large that it would fit a foot clothed in a shoe or boot. A second, incomplete footprint is a lightly pecked outline of a shod right foot, 24 cm long and 10 cm in maximum width. It has a pronounced taper to the heel; further internal peck-marks suggest that it was to have been hollowed out. It is on the same alignment as the other footprint.

A crag near the chapel of Keil and St. Columba's Well, between Dunaverty Bay and Carskey in Kintyre, has two footprints carved at a place where St. Columba is reputed to have first set foot in Dalriada, Scotland. One is recent, and the other genuinely old. Kingship rituals may have been connected with this petrosomatoglyph. St. Columba's footprints are to be found at Southend in Argyll. Two examples exist in Angus. The caves below Keil Point on the Isle of Arran contain a slab which may have been an ancient altar. It has the prints of two right feet on it, said to be of Saint Columba. The Giant Fingal of Arran is said to have had a son born in the King's Cave who left a  footprint on the cave side. On Islay, there was a Stone of Inauguration by Finlaggan. It was seven feet square and had footprints cut into it. When a chief of the Clan Donald was installed as the King of the Isles, he stood barefoot on the imprints on the stone, and with his father's stone in his hand, was anointed King by the Bishop of Argyll and seven priests. During the ceremony, an orator recited a list of his ancestors and, he was proclaimed "Macdonald, high prince of the seed of Conn". The block was deliberately destroyed in the early seventeenth century. At Spittal, near Drymen, is a footprint which may be due to natural weathering. It is located at the western end of a long ridge of natural rock outcrop. A quarry for two millstones is nearby. At Craigmaddie Muir, Baldernock, East Dunbartonshire is the Auld Wives Lifts. This is a complicated assemblage of carvings on a rock platform. On the rock are serpent-like forms, crosses, cups and an impression of the right foot of an adult. At Dunino Den near St Andrews in Fife, is a footprint and a basin carved in the surface of a sandstone outcrop. A Celtic cross has been carved nearby, possibly as an attempt to Christianise the site.

Footprints in Ireland

Close to St. Olann's Well at Coolineagh, near Coachford, County Cork, are the footprints of St. Olann on a boulder. In the garden of Belmont, on the Greencastle Road, about a mile from Derry, there was, in 1837, a block called St. Columba's Stone with two footprints on it. It may have been the inauguration stone of the Kings of Aileach, brought here by the local Chief of Derry. On the Clare Hills in Ireland, on the Gort to Feakle road in the townland of Drumandoora, is the engraved outline or impression of a foot clothed by a sandal. On the Hill of Lech, or, previously, Mullach Leaght, the "Hill of the Stone", three miles (5 km) southwest of Monaghan in Ireland, was the inauguration stone of the Mac Mahons. It was used in 1595 and destroyed by a farm owner in 1809.
At Clonmacnoise, County Offaly, Ireland, close to the Chapel of Clonfinlough. there are several limestone boulders, one of which is called the Fairy's or Horseman's Stone.  It has many cup-shaped hollows, crosses, daggers, and a pair of human feet. At Templemore in County Londonderry is a slab named St. Columbkille's Stone.  It has the imprint of two feet, each ten inches (254 mm) in length. Traditionally, it was the inauguration stone of the ancient Irish chieftains. Saint Columba's Stone near Derry has two depressions like the marks of feet. The O'Doherty's are said to have stood on this stone with bare feet at their inaugurations. At Slievenamon (The Mountain of the Women), at South Tipperary in Ireland, is the rock that bears the footprints of Goll—"the One-Eyed"—who made a giant leap across the valley to catch up with the hunt of the Fianna.
The West Pier in Howth Harbour, Dublin, displays a specimen of footprints from King George IV's visit in 1821.

Footprints in England and Wales

"King Arthur's Footprint" is a hollow in the rock at the highest point of Tintagel Island's southern side. It is not entirely natural, having been shaped by human hands at some stage. It may have been used for the inauguration of kings or chieftains as the site is known to have a long history stretching back to the Dark Ages.
At Poole Farm in Somerset, a cist cover was found with footprints and cupmarks. The decorated cist slab is displayed in Bristol Museum. Originally it was in position on the south side of the Pool Farm Cist, which was contained within a round barrow. Excavation revealed the cremated remains of a child and an adult. However, these carvings do have similarities with the Calderstones in Liverpool and others in Scandinavia. The footprinted Calderstones in Liverpool may have come from a Lancashire passage-grave. Sharkey sees a link of artistic influence between these and those at Petit-Mont in Brittany.
On a rock formerly visible at the eastern end of Holyhead church in Anglesey, Wales, was the footprint of St. Cybi.

Footprints in the Isle of Man
The Swearing Stone found at Castleward earthwork was probably used in inauguration ceremonies.

Footprints in Brittany
A passage-grave at Petit-Mont Arzon in Brittany contains a stone with a pair of feet, toes pointing upwards. Sharkey sees these carvings as coming from the same artistic tradition as those on the Calderstones. At Dol de Bretagne in Brittany are found the footprints of St. Michael on Mont Dol as well as a claw mark of the devil. At Petit-Mont passage grave near Arzon in Brittany can be found the relief of two upturned feet.

Footprints in Germany
On the Totenberg near Minden in the Geismarwald, a commander in the Thirty Years War declared before a battle that he had as much chance of winning as he had of the stone becoming soft. It did and his foot and hand-prints are still there to be seen by all.
At Rosenstein Castle on the Heuberg in the Remo Valley is a rock with the form of a beautiful human foot, and on the mountain opposite, the Scheulberg, is a similar imprint. The ruins of Rosenstein Castle, known today for its caves, sit above Heubach, while the Scheulberg is near Beuran to the Southeast; they are approximately 3 km apart.
A knight's heel print can allegedly be seen in the sandstone on the terrace of the Heidelberg Castle.

Footprints in Italy

The petroglyphs of footprints are very common in the Val Camonica rock art (over 200 in the single Rock 6 in Foppe di Nadro area).
The tracks were left more than 325,000 years ago, during an eruption. They were preserved in the ash. Locals called the prints "devil's trails".

Footprints in France
The petroglyphs of footprints are very common in France. Some of them are

 "Le Pas De Saint Gouéno" or footprint of Saint Gouéno in Saint-Gouéno (Côtes d'Armor)
 "Le Pas de Saint Malo" or footprint of Saint (Machutus) which is in fact the footprint of his horse at Saint-Malo-de-Guersac (Loire-Atlantique)
 "Pas-de-Saint-Martin" or footprint of Saint Martin at Saint-Épain (Indre-et-Loire), but also at Bouze-lès-Beaune (Côte d'Or) ...

Footprints in Africa

The Laetoli footprints are hominid tracks left behind in then-soft volcanic ash nearly 3.7 million years ago. The prints were discovered by Mary Leakey and others in 1978.

Footprints in other parts of the world

A set of Jesus's footprints, according to legend, are preserved at the Church of Domine Quo Vadis outside of Rome. In Buddhist symbolism, a Buddhapada (footprint of the Buddha) with Dharmacakra and Triratna symbols from the 1st century is to be found at Gandhāra, Northern Pakistan.

Sweden's rich flora of petroglyphs include many hundred footprints, singles and in pairs.

On Sri Pada, or Adam's Peak, a mountain in Sri Lanka, is a footprint mark said by Buddhists to be that of the left foot of the Buddha, the right footprint being in a city about 150 kilometres distant, or at Phra Sat in Thailand. Tamil Hindus consider it to be the footprint of Shiva. Some Muslims and Christians ascribe it to Adam, where Adam the "first ancestor" is said to have set foot as he was exiled from the Garden of Eden. Sometimes Christians ascribe it to Saint Thomas, the "Apostle of India". Footprints of the Buddha also exist in Afghanistan, Bhutan, Cambodia, China, India, Japan, Korea, Laos, Malaysia, the Maldives, Pakistan, Singapore, and Burma. The St. Victor's Petroglyphs in Provincial Park, Saskatchewan, Canada, feature human footprints.

A human-like footprint in volcanic ash was discovered in 1970 during the construction of the Demirköprü Dam in Turkey. The ash was dated as having been deposited about 250,000 years ago.

Knee prints

A tradition of body-part impressions at holy wells, rivers and beneath waterfalls comes from the fact that Celtic monks or culdees often prayed in such places, continuing the veneration of the Druids for sacred waters. Folk belief ascribes healing powers to waters taken from these holy impressions, and this water was used to cure sickness, wounds and sores, as well as preventing or curing sickness in animals such as cattle.

At Llangynnlo in Wales are Olgliniau Cynllo, the knee prints of King Cynllo at prayer. At Troedraur in Dyfed, South Wales are the knee-marks of St. Gwyndaf Hen impressed on a flat rock in the bed of the River Ceri. These are 'pot holes' or Rock-cut basins made by the grinding effect of stone in the river currents to the sceptics. St Cynwyl in the river at Caio in Wales. St. Beuno at Llanaelhaiarn in Wales. At Arthur's Stone chambered tomb in Hereford & Worcester is a cup-mark stone which bears the imprints of King Arthur's knees left behind after he prayed to God in thanks for victory over a giant (or king) whom he had killed and whose tomb this is. At Llanllyfni in Wales are the knee prints of St. Gredfyw.

John O'Donovan, in his Ordnance Survey Letters of 1840, tells the story of Saint Moling crossing a small hill in the County Wexford district, when an evil spirit annoyed him. He knelt on a rock to curse the spirit, leaving the impression of his knees on the stone. While there is no account of the stone today, it is said that the incident gave the name to the townland Cloch na Mallacht, i.e. "the stones of the curses", linking the episode to Bullaun stones which often contain cursing stones.

Near St Fillan's Kirk in Renfrewshire there is recorded a large flat rock called the 'Kneelins Stane' that had three depressions, two made by the knees of pilgrims and the third made by their staffs.

Hands and arms

A diminutive pair of hands are carved on a boulder beside the Crinan Canal in Argyll. The St. Victor's Petroglyphs Provincial Park, in Saskatchewan, Canada, feature hand-prints. From Waldenbuch in Germany is a four-sided stone pillar with scroll carving and a left arm and hand. At Oberhasli on the road to Gadmen near Meiringen in Switzerland is the Sterbensstein, a rock with the impression of a hand and several fingers left by a dying man after he had been attacked. Near Minden in the Geismarwald on the Totenberg in Germany, an army leader who before a battle in the Thirty Years' War declared that he had as much chance of winning as he had of the stone becoming soft. It did, and his foot- and hand-prints are still there to be seen by all.

A carved left hand is to be found on the wall of the Decorated Hall in the Hypogeum of Ħal-Saflieni on Malta. It measures 8¼" by 4". At Arthur's Stone chambered tomb in Hereford and Worcester is a "cup mark" stone which bears the imprints of a king's or giant's elbow, left behind after he fell dead to the ground, killed by King Arthur. The Petroglyph National Monument has an estimated 20,000 carved images, including many of hands. These images are inseparable from the cultural landscape, the spirits of the people who created and who appreciate them. At Barnakill near Dunardy in Argyll is a stone bearing two hand prints. The hands appear to have a covering; one may be the back of the hand having interesting designs, the other being the palm with some faint markings.

At Llanllyfni in Wales is the thumb print of St. Gredfyw. Near Strathpeffer in Scotland is the finger and thumb print of a dwarf associate of Finn Mac Cuill on an old gate post near to the Pictish Eagle Stone.

In Argyll and Bute, Kilneuair's kirk has inside, to the east of the nave door, a sandstone block bearing a now almost invisible five-toed print with nails on three of the toes and which is referred to as 'the Devil's hand'. The story goes that a local tailor did not believe in the Devil and Old Nick appeared as a skeleton just missing the man and scratching the wall with his bone hand.

Eyes
At St. Mary's Church in Newchurch-in-Pendle, an eye is carved on the tower, said to be the all-seeing eye of God. Local tradition says that it was originally placed there to protect the worshippers from the witches who once plagued the district. In Almería, Spain, is a carved limestone pillar with eyes or the oculos / oculi motif. The eyes have eyebrows and/or accentuating arcs. An "eye goddess" may have existed as shown by many other examples of carved oculi. The Folkton "drums" are made of chalk and are elaborately carved, with distinct oculi or eyes.  Petrospheres or carved stone balls from Scotland, especially the Aberdeen area, often have concentric carved lines, some of which appear to be stylised oculi. Pecked carvings of "eyebrows" are found on a lintel inside Holm of Papa Westray south chambered cairn, Orkney. They are similar to the 'owlish' eyes and eyebrows carved on the Folkton Drums. The Food-vessel peoples at the Tregulland barrow near Bodmin moor in Cornwall had placed slate slabs around the central burial bearing circular pecked hollows resembling oculi, presumably having a protective function for the person buried within.

Heads

Sikhara top of Bayon at Angkor Wat complex are carved in the image of Hindu-Buddhist Khmer kings.

The Celts are well known for their cult of the "severed head" of which many examples exist as three-dimensional carvings or sculptures. Petrosomatoglyphs are much rarer. Pump Sant Stone near Carmarthen in Wales has the imprint in it of the heads of the five saints, named Ceitho, Celynnin, Gwyn, Gwyno and Gwynoro. The stone is made of Diorite, a very hard stone brought from another district. It stands on a mound facing the Ogofau Lodge of Dolaucothi House, near to the Roman Gold Mines. It has depressions on all four faces characteristic of the wear produced from crushing quartz.

The Serpent Stone from a Roman cemetery in Maryport in Cumbria has a Celtic severed head wearing a torc carved on the top of a phallic-shaped pillar. On the back is a carving of a serpent. At Tarren Deusant, Llantrisant in Mid-Glamorgan is a pagan site with two heads originally carved, showing incised eyebrows and slit mouths characteristic of some Celtic cult heads. Six other heads have been carved since 1696, when they were first recorded. The Husjatyn god-pillar from the River Zbrucz in Galicia, Poland, has several heads carved on its four sides, together with images of horses, people and weapons. A pointed stone from Rottenburg am Neckar, at Stammheim in Stuttgart, has a rudimentary human face carved on it. From Entremont, Bouches-du-Rhône in France is a four-sided stone pillar with numerous engraved stone heads. The pillar came from the Celtic sanctuary which was destroyed by the Romans in 124 BC. At Alderly Edge, Cheshire, England, is the face of Merlin carved into the native rock face of a crag.

Two carved stone heads are located at Chapelhall House, Innellan, Argyll. One resembles a Celtic stone head and may indeed be one, the other is more likely to have been a corbel in the early medieval chapel that lay nearby. St. Aid, or Áed mac Bricc, was Bishop of Killare in the 6th century. At Saint Aid's birth, his head had hit a stone, leaving a hole that collected rainwater that cured all ailments, thus linking it with the Irish tradition of Bullaun stones. On the Victorian viaduct in the Pass of Killiecrankie is a well-defined face carved into one ashlar block.

Saint Aid or Áed mac Bricc was Bishop of Killare in 6th-century. At Saint Aid's birth his head had hit a stone, leaving a petrosomatoglyph type hole in which collected rainwater that cured all ailments, identifying it also with the Irish tradition of Bullaun stones and possible links to cup and ring mark stones.

The female form and reproductive structures

It has been stated that many of the signs or symbols which accompany maze or geometric patterns from sites such as Newgrange in Ireland are identifiable or interpretable as human, the womb (lens symbol), the pubic area (lozenge symbol), fallopian horns (ram's horns), the female form (hour-glass symbol), breasts (w or omega symbol), etc. The vesica piscis shape as found on the lid of the Chalice Well at Glastonbury includes an almond- or lozenge-shaped central area that is seen as a possible representation of the female genitals. Meehan does not, however, clearly indicate his sources for these interpretations.

In the gallery-grave of Kerguntuil at Tregastel in Brittany are nine pairs of breasts above engraved necklaces.

Barclodiad y Gawres is a passage-grave on Anglesey with its internal surfaces decorated with lozenges, chevrons, wavy lines and spirals. The whole tomb has been likened to a womb, that of the Mother Goddess. These symbols are also commonly used in passage graves found in Ireland and Brittany. Triangular stones are sometimes regarded as being representations of the female sexual organs or overall body shape. At Boscawen un stone circle in Cornwall, a leaning central standing stone and a large white quartz boulder may represent the male and female elements of nature. At Carn Euny Iron Age village in Cornwall is a fogou which may represent the womb of the Great Earth Mother.

At Avebury and West Kennet Avenue in Wiltshire, the tall pillar and "broad diamond shape" stones were used alternately in the stone circles, possibly symbolising males and females at this famous pagan ritual site. Stoney Littleton Long Barrow near Bath has been likened to a "womb-tomb" of the Great Goddess who awaited the return of the sun.

Tolmen stones, such as the example on the North Teign river on Dartmoor, England, are said to derive their name from the Cornish tol ("hole") and maen ("stone") and were thought to have been used by Druids for purification and that the wrongdoer was lowered through into the water for lustration, a purification rite or cleansing ritual. The hole in the stone represented the female birth canal in the Druid or pagan mind, and by passing through it, a person was symbolising the act of rebirth and therefore regaining innocence or being cleansed of post-parturition illness, etc.

Male reproductive structures

Shivalinga is carved in numerous Hindu temples across Indian subcontinent and southeast Asia, including in Angkor Wat, rock-cut temples in India such as Aihole, Ajanta Caves, Amarnath Temple, Badami cave temples, Ellora Caves, Gavi Gangadhareshwara Temple, Hampi, Hulimavu Shiva cave temple, Mahabalipuram, Masroor Rock Cut Temple, Udaygiri Caves, Vaishno Devi, etc.

Many references have been made to the obviously phallic appearance of standing stones. It is suggested that they may serve as stylised representations of the phallus, the purpose of which is to magically enhance the fertility of humans, animals and crops. A number of practices which are supposed to give fertility to barren women are linked to standing stones throughout Europe. At Avebury and West Kennet Avenue in Wiltshire, the tall pillar and broad diamond shape stones were used alternately in the stone circles, possibly symbolising males and females at these famous pagan ritual sites. At Boscawen un stone circle in Cornwall, a leaning central standing stone and a large white quartz boulder may represent the male and female elements of nature. The Maypole is often considered a phallic symbol, coinciding with the worship of Germanic phallic figures such as that of Freyr.

Phallic fertility symbols were carved for good luck, and they were also a powerful antagonist to the evil eye. The Romans regularly carved them onto military buildings, and Hadrian's Wall has several at Chesters and Housesteads forts. One at Barcombe Hill shows a crude phallus and testicles with the legs of a chicken. In Portugal, phalli are represented together with cup-marks, zig-zags, straggly-lines, etc., on the ninety or so stones of the 4000-year-old Cromeleque dos Almendres near Évora. At Valhaugen in Norway a realistic representation of a phallus has been found and restored.

Multiple body parts
At Portpatrick on the Island of St. Kilda, there is the impression of a pair of knees and a right hand, said to be those of St. Patrick in the posture of prayer. In Cornwall, St. Newlyna knelt on a stone and left the impression of her elbows and knees in the posture of prayer. At Llanllyfni are found stones with the knee-prints, thumb and bed of St. Gredfyw. Medicine Rock in the USA was located on a hill fifteen miles (24 km) west of Gettysburg, near the mouth of the Cheyenne Creek. Indians considered it to be a sacred rock and visited it regularly. Five footprints, hand prints and animal prints were originally visible, made by the Great Spirit of the Native Americans.

Recent and modern petrosomatoglyphs

Located at Smithills Hall, near Bolton in Lancashire, is the impressed footprint at the bottom of a set of stairs of George Marsh, a Protestant martyr. In 1555, Marsh was interrogated at Smithills Hall and then taken to Boughton in Cheshire and burnt at the stake for the sake of his faith. It is said that the footprint is a divine reminder of this unjust persecution and murder.

Often, impressions of hands are made in concrete to commemorate the famous as at Grauman's Chinese Theatre in Hollywood (USA) on pavement slabs or in wet concrete. Making footprints in stone of family members is part of New Age beliefs.

In Sarajevo, there is a preserved square of footpath or pavement asphalt with two shoe prints which are believed to be those of Gavrilo Princip, made as he waited for the arrival of the motorcade of the Austrian Archduke Ferdinand in June 1914.  The Archduke's assassination precipitated the start of the Great War.

See also

References

External links

Historia Britonum Cabal's or Cafal's Cairn and King Arthur's hunting dog's pawprint.
 The Sheela Na Gig website.
 King Arthur's footprint at Tintagel.
 Photographs of petrosomatoglyphs.
Scottish Glacial Erratics in History, Myth & Legend
 Petroglyph National Monument, New Mexico.
 A Researcher's Guide to Local History terminology.
 The Barrnakill Hands Neolithic rock carving near Cairnbaan, Argyll.

Archaeological artefact types
Prehistoric art
Rock art
Prehistoric inscriptions
Sacred rocks